Gary Martin Stevens (born 3 August 1954) is an English former professional footballer who played as a striker or defender.

Stevens was playing non-league football for Evesham United while working at Wiggins (later Special Metals) Herefordshire, when he was spotted by Cardiff City, and signed for the club during the summer of 1978 for a £4,000 fee. He made his debut in September of that year, during a 7–1 defeat against Luton Town, and scored his first goal a week later on his home debut in a 2–0 victory over Blackburn Rovers. Gary went on to score a total of thirteen goals in all competitions in his first year. The following year he finished as the club's joint top scorer, along with Ray Bishop, scoring eleven goals, and went on to claim the award again during the 1981–82 season.

Following the end of the season he joined Shrewsbury Town for £20,000. He spent four years at the club before ending his career with spells at Brentford and Hereford United. He was also player coach at Mid Wales League side Knighton Town.

He is now a college tutor, is manager of Wellington, and works part-time for the Herefordshire FA.

References

1954 births
Living people
Footballers from Birmingham, West Midlands
English footballers
Association football forwards
Association football defenders
English Football League players
Evesham United F.C. players
Cardiff City F.C. players
Shrewsbury Town F.C. players
Brentford F.C. players
Hereford United F.C. players
Knighton Town F.C. players